Gary Alfred Townend (born 1 April 1940) is an English former footballer who played as an inside forward.

Career
In 1960, Townend signed for Millwall from non-league club Redhill. In four years at Millwall, Townend scored 20 goals in 50 Football League appearances. Following his time at Millwall, Townend played for Hillingdon Borough, Chelmsford City, Weymouth and Wealdstone.

References

1940 births
Living people
Association football forwards
English footballers
Footballers from Kilburn, London
Redhill F.C. players
Millwall F.C. players
Hillingdon Borough F.C. players
Chelmsford City F.C. players
Weymouth F.C. players
Wealdstone F.C. players
English Football League players